Florence Mary Wilson (–1946)  was a poet who wrote the ballad The Man from God Knows Where.

Life
Born in Lisburn, Co. Antrim to Robert Addy a mill manager, she married solicitor Fred Wilson in 1898 and lived in Bangor, County Down with whom she had six children. Wilson was a regular contributor to the Irish Homestead, Northern Whig, and other papers. She was a friend of Alice Milligan and Alice Stopford Green. Wilson wrote the ballad, The Man from God Knows Where in 1918 about Thomas Russell. She wrote a volume of poetry The Coming of the Earls which was republished frequently and was popular in America.

References 

Irish women poets
1870 births
1946 deaths
People from County Antrim
People from County Down